Lubomira Bacheva and Åsa Svensson were the defending champions, but both players chose to compete at Palermo in the same week.

Petra Mandula and Patricia Wartusch won the title by defeating Gisela Dulko and Conchita Martínez Granados 6–2, 6–1 in the final.

Seeds

Draw

Draw

References

External links
 Official results archive (ITF)
 Official results archive (WTA)

2002 WTA Tour
Morocco Open
2002 in Moroccan tennis